Puerto Santa Cruz  is a town and municipality in Santa Cruz Province in southern Argentina. It lies near the Atlantic coast on the northern bank of the estuary of Santa Cruz River. It is the second oldest city in the province, being founded in 1878. It was the capital of the Santa Cruz National Territory until Río Gallegos took over the position in 1888. The town is a local centre for sheep and cattle farming. The presence of fresh water in an otherwise semi-arid environment allows for orchards and a local horticulture.

Climate

Notes

References

Populated places in Santa Cruz Province, Argentina
Populated coastal places in Argentina
Cities in Argentina
Argentina
Santa Cruz Province, Argentina